Andrej Rastovac (born 24 June 1981) is a Slovenian footballer currently under contract for Australian side Adelaide Blue Eagles from Adelaide.

External links

soccerterminal.com

1987 births
Living people
Slovenian footballers
Association football defenders
Slovenian expatriate footballers
Slovenian expatriate sportspeople in Romania
Expatriate footballers in Romania
Liga I players
NK Primorje players
FCV Farul Constanța players
FK Beograd (Australia) players
Expatriate soccer players in Australia
Sportspeople from Koper
National Premier Leagues players